The 1985 Rice Owls football team was an American football team that represented Rice University in the Southwest Conference during the 1985 NCAA Division I-A football season. In their second year under head coach Watson Brown, the team compiled a 3–8 record.

Schedule

References

Rice
Rice Owls football seasons
Rice Owls football